A burgee is a distinguishing flag, regardless of its shape, of a recreational boating organization. In most cases, they have the shape of a pennant.

Etiquette
Yacht clubs and their members may fly their club's burgee while under way and at anchor, day or night. Sailing vessels may fly the burgee either from the main masthead or from a halyard under the lowermost starboard spreader.  Most powerboats (i.e. those lacking any mast or having a single mast) fly the burgee off a short staff at the bow; two-masted power vessels fly the burgee at the foremast.

Flag officers
The officers of a yacht club may fly various burgees appropriate to their rank: for example, the commodore may fly a swallow-tailed version of the club burgee (and the vice- and rear-commodores the same, but distinguished by the addition of one or two balls respectively at the canton). A past-commodore may also be given a distinctively-shaped flag.

See also

Broad pennant
Civil ensign
Courtesy flag
Ensign
Maritime flag
Naval ensign

References

External links
Flags of Yacht Clubs
 Crystal Lake Yacht Club's Burgee collection

Maritime flags

pt:Galhardete